In mathematics, a lethargy theorem is a statement about the distance of points in a metric space from members of a sequence of subspaces; one application in numerical analysis is to approximation theory, where such theorems quantify the difficulty of approximating general functions by functions of special form, such as polynomials.  In more recent work, the convergence of a sequence of operators is studied: these operators generalise the projections of the earlier work.

Bernstein's lethargy theorem

Let  be a strictly ascending sequence of finite-dimensional linear subspaces of a Banach space X, and let  be a decreasing sequence of real numbers tending to zero.  Then there exists a point x in X such that the distance of x to Vi is exactly .

See also
 Bernstein's theorem (approximation theory)

References
 
 
 
 
 
 
 Preprint

Theorems in approximation theory